Abedi Ayew (born 5 November 1964), known professionally as Abedi Pele, is a Ghanaian former professional footballer who played as an attacking midfielder and who served as captain of the Ghana national team. He is regarded as one of the greatest African footballers of all time. He played for several European clubs and found his fame in the French Ligue 1 with Lille and Marseille, the latter where he won the UEFA Champions League in 1993, among other titles. He is widely regarded as one of the greatest players of his generation.

Early life
Abedi Ayew was born into a family in the town of Kibi and grew up in the town of Dome at the northern outskirts of the city Accra.

He attended Ghana Senior High School in Tamale. He was given the nickname "Pelé" due to his ability in football, which evoked comparisons to the late Brazilian athlete Pelé.

Club career 
He was one of the first African players to make an impact on European club football. Abedi Pelé's nomadic career began with Real Tamale United in Ghana in 1978. He left Ghana after the 1982 African Cup of Nations to join Al Sadd in Qatar for a $1,000 transfer fee. After a short spell with FC Zürich, he returned to Ghana but, after both Kotoko and Hearts of Oak failed to sign him, joined AS Dragons FC de l'Ouémé in Benin. He would later return to Ghana and play for Real Tamale United for one season. He began his career in Europe with French side Chamois Niort, subsequently joining Marseille before transferring to Lille on loan.

At club level, he was a key figure in Marseille's dominance of the French league, resulting in four league championships and two European Cup finals appearances. At Marseille, he was a member of the team's "Magical Trio" along with Jean-Pierre Papin and Chris Waddle, spearheading perhaps Europe's strongest league side of the early 1990s, including a European Cup final defeat in 1991. Abedi was the only remaining member of the trio still with the side when Marseille defeated Milan in the 1993 Champions League final in Munich.

He later joined Lyon after his loan spell at Lille. He also played for Torino of Italy and rounded out his European career with 1860 Munich.

Abedi Pele went on to sign a two-year contract with Al Ain in the United Arab Emirates and was nominated one of the best foreign players to play in the UAE league.

International career 
Abedi Pele played for Ghana 73 times. He was a fixture in the African Championships of the 1980s and '90s with his national team, and a member of Ghana's victorious team in the 1982 African Cup of Nations, but he never had an opportunity to play in the FIFA World Cup, as the Black Stars failed to qualify for the competition during his career. However, he was arguably the most dominant figure on the African football scene for nearly a decade. His performance in the 1992 African Cup of Nations, for which he was voted the player of the tournament, was particularly notable, as he scored in three successive rounds to help Ghana reach the final, but picked up a yellow card in the semi-final against Nigeria that meant he was suspended for the final; Ghana went on to lose on penalties to the Ivory Coast. The performance earned him the added nickname of "The African Maradona".

Abedi was one of the first African football players to earn a top placing in FIFA World Player of the Year voting, doing so in 1991 and 1992. He won the France Football African Player of the Year Award three consecutive years, was the inaugural winner of the BBC African Sports Star of the Year in 1992, and the corresponding Confederation of African Football award twice.

Abedi holds the record for most appearances at the African Cup of Nations. He made his first appearance at the in Libya in 1982 and continued to compete at the tournament for the next 16 years, his last appearance coming in the 1998 edition in Burkina Faso. Aside from his exploits at the 1992 competition, Abedi also earned much acclaim for his three goals at the 1996 competition, where he led Ghana to the semi-finals of the competition despite critics expecting him to be in the twilight of his career.

After retirement

Ayew has participated in more FIFA organized charity matches than any other African player. Abedi Pele is a member of FIFA's Football Committee, and of the player status committees of both FIFA and CAF. That explains why the South African FA made him a Spokesperson for their 2006 World Cup bid.

In appreciation of Abedi's devout services to the country, the Ghanaian government awarded him the country's highest honour, the Order of the Volta (civil division). He thus became the first Ghanaian sportsman to be so honoured.

CAF-UEFA All Star
Amongst his international accolades, he was often included in FIFA "All-Star" selections and captained the African All-Stars in their victory over their European counterparts in the 1997 Meridian Cup.

On 29 January 1997, the first UEFA–CAF Meridian Cup All-Star Match between Europe and Africa was played in Benfica's Estádio da Luz in Lisbon and was televised in 100 countries worldwide, including 30 in Africa, for an audience of 60 million viewers. Abedi Pele scored a goal early in the first half and, after Vincent Guérin had equalised for Europe just before half-time, it was the 1998 African Player of the Year, Mustapha Hadji, who struck Africa's 78th-minute winner in the 2–1 win.

In 2001, the UEFA–CAF Meridian Cup All-Star Match format was changed slightly for the second All-Star Match to bring together players aged between 35 and 45 who now revel in their 'veteran' status and play the game purely for pleasure. The squad sparked off memories of great footballing moments at club and international level

Football Ambassador
In June 2001 he was nominated by the present government of Ghana to serve as the next Chairman of the FA, an opportunity he later gave up for a more experienced former coach of Ghana for which in his own words said that this was to be an opportunity to learn from his superiors.

At present he owns a first division club, called Nania, with the future hopes of nurturing the young talent to augment the fledgling league of the country. He has also been involved with various charity work across the African continent.

Controversy
Abedi Pele was embroiled in a serious alleged Second Division Promotion Play-off bribery scandal for which the Ghana Football Association found him and others guilty. The guilty verdict attracted fines and suspensions of Abedi and others, but these have been quashed by the Appeals Committee of the Football Association after determining that there were irregularities in the initial judgement of the Ghana Football Association. The allegations stem from an astonishing 31–0 victory recorded by his club, Nania FC over a much respected Okwawu United side. A similarly farcical 28–0 result was recorded in another second division match played between Great Mariners and Tudu Mighty Jets on the same weekend. The clubs involved in that Second Division Promotion Play-off Zone III match were also investigated and subject to the prospect of stiff penalties and demotions. Despite his vehement denials, Abedi had been chastised by some members of the Ghanaian media, who were demanding that strong punitive actions be taken against him, by Ghana's football governing body as well as the legal system. His wife Maha Ayew was on 3 November 2008 banned from football against this Manipulations Scandal.

Style of play
As a playmaker, Pele was known for his speed, close control, and dribbling skills, as well as his passing and goalscoring ability. He usually played as an attacking midfielder or as a forward. He was also given the nicknames the "Maestro" and "The African Maradona."

Personal life
Abedi is the brother of Kwame and Sola Ayew (ex-Hearts of Oak and Black Meteors). He is also the father of André, Jordan, Rahim, Imani, and is married to Maha. His sons, Ibrahim, André and Jordan, have also become internationals for Ghana.  Andre and Rahim - represented Ghana in the FIFA 2010 World Cup in South Africa while Jordan and Andre represented Ghana in the 2014 FIFA World Cup in Brazil and the 2022 FIFA World Cup in Qatar.

Career statistics

Honours

Player 
Marseille
 French Division 1: 1990–91, 1991–92
 UEFA Champions League: 1992–93; runner-up: 1990–91

Al Ain
 Pro-League: 1999–2000
 UAE President's Cup: 1999

Ghana
 African Cup of Nations: 1982; runners-up: 1992
 West African Nations Cup: 1982, 1983, 1984

Individual
 BBC African Footballer of the Year: 1991
 African Footballer of the Year: 1991, 1992, 1993
 Africa Cup of Nations Golden Ball: 1992
 Africa Cup of Nations Team of the Tournament: 1992, 1994, 1996
 Ghana Footballer of the Year: 1993
 IFFHS African Player of the Century (1901–2000): 3rd Best
 IFFHS All-time Africa Men's Dream Team: 2021
 FIFA World Player of the Year: 9th 1992, Nomination 1991
 FIFA All-Star Forward: 1996 (Reserve), 1997 (Reserve), 1999
 FIFA 100
 Golden Foot Legends Award: 2011
 Ghana Football Awards Living Legend Award: 2022
 Ghana SWAG Best Colts (Young) Player: 1978
 On 26 March 2004, he was appointed a "(WAFUNIF) Special Envoy 4 Peace and Development"
 CAF Top 30 African Footballers in the last 50 years: 5th place

Orders
  OOTV Civil Division: Order of the Volta: (1996)

Manager 
Nania

 Ghanaian FA Cup: 2011

 Ghana Super Cup: 2011

See also

References

External links

 

1964 births
Living people
People from Eastern Region (Ghana)
Ghanaian Muslims
Footballers from Accra
Ghanaian footballers
Association football midfielders
Real Tamale United players
Al Sadd SC players
FC Zürich players
AS Dragons FC de l'Ouémé players
Chamois Niortais F.C. players
FC Mulhouse players
Olympique de Marseille players
Lille OSC players
Olympique Lyonnais players
Torino F.C. players
TSV 1860 Munich players
Al Ain FC players
Ghana Premier League players
Qatar Stars League players
Swiss Super League players
Benin Premier League players
Ligue 2 players
Ligue 1 players
Serie A players
Bundesliga players
UAE Pro League players
UEFA Champions League winning players
African Footballer of the Year winners
Ghana international footballers
1982 African Cup of Nations players
1992 African Cup of Nations players
1996 African Cup of Nations players
1998 African Cup of Nations players
Africa Cup of Nations-winning players
FIFA 100
Ghanaian expatriate footballers
Ghanaian expatriate sportspeople in Qatar
Ghanaian expatriate sportspeople in Switzerland
Ghanaian expatriate sportspeople in Benin
Ghanaian expatriate sportspeople in France
Ghanaian expatriate sportspeople in Italy
Ghanaian expatriate sportspeople in Germany
Ghanaian expatriate sportspeople in the United Arab Emirates
Expatriate footballers in Qatar
Expatriate footballers in Switzerland
Expatriate footballers in Benin
Expatriate footballers in France
Expatriate footballers in Italy
Expatriate footballers in Germany
Expatriate footballers in the United Arab Emirates
Recipients of the Order of the Volta
Ghana Senior High School (Tamale) alumni
Ayew family
Real Tamale United non-playing staff